Harjumägi (also Harju Gate Hill) is a park in Tallinn, Estonia.

The park is located on the Ingrian Bastion. Ingrian Bastion was built in 1690s. In 1861–1862, the Ingrian Bastion was changed to the park. At the same time, the Mayer's Stairs were built.

Since 1959, the park is taken under protection.

References

Parks in Tallinn